Another Piece of Me is the third studio album by Danish pop singer Bryan Rice. It was released in Denmark on 25 October 2010 by RecArt Music.

Track listing

References

External links

2010 albums
Bryan Rice albums